Reeves Lake, which is oval shaped, has a surface area of . Reeves Lake southeast side of Winter Haven, Florida, is completely within the city limits. This lake is in a suburban area. Residential areas border this lake on the northwest and eastern shores. Swampland borders much of the rest of the shore. On the southwest is a house surrounded by much land.

Reeves Lake has no public access. There is, however, a private park that has a private fishing dock on Rutledge Court, on the north side of the lake.

References

Lakes of Polk County, Florida